Lukáš Krenželok (born 30 June 1983, in Ostrava) is a Czech professional ice hockey forward who currently plays for HC Slavia Praha of the Czech Extraliga.

He previously played for HC Havířov and HC Vítkovice.

References

External links 
 

1983 births
Living people
HC Slavia Praha players
HC Vítkovice players
Czech ice hockey forwards
Sportspeople from Ostrava
HC Bílí Tygři Liberec players